Let's Be Famous is a 1939 British comedy film directed by Walter Forde and starring Jimmy O'Dea, Betty Driver and Sonnie Hale. It was made by Associated Talking Pictures, with shooting beginning in November 1938. The film's art direction was by the Austrian Oscar Werndorff, in his final production.

Cast
 Jimmy O'Dea as Jimmy Houlihan 
 Betty Driver as Betty Pinbright 
 Sonnie Hale as Finch 
 Patrick Barr as Johnny Blake 
 Basil Radford as Watson 
 Milton Rosmer as Albert Pinbright
 Lena Brown as Polly Pinbright
 Henry Hallett as Grenville 
 Garry Marsh as BBC Official
 Franklyn Bellamy as Ali Benali (as Franklin Bellamy)
 Hay Plumb as Announcer
 Alf Goddard as Battling Bulger
 Raymond Huntley as Singer in trio (uncredited)

References

Bibliography
 Low, Rachael. Filmmaking in 1930s Britain. George Allen & Unwin, 1985.
 Perry, George. Forever Ealing. Pavilion Books, 1994.
 Sutton, David R. A Chorus of Raspberries: British Film Comedy 1929-1939. University of Exeter Press, 2000.
 Wood, Linda. British Films, 1927-1939. British Film Institute, 1986.

External links

1939 films
1939 musical comedy films
British musical comedy films
British black-and-white films
Associated Talking Pictures
Films directed by Walter Forde
Films set in London
Films scored by Jack Beaver
1930s English-language films
1930s British films